There is a U.S. Embassy in Guatemala located in Guatemala City. According to the United States Department of State, relations between the United States and Guatemala have traditionally been close, although sometimes they are tense regarding human, civil, and military rights.

According to a world opinion poll, 82% of Guatemalans view the United States positively in 2002 According to the 2012 United States Global Leadership Report, 41% of Guatemalans approve of U.S. leadership, with 16% disapproving and 43% uncertain. In 2017, 67% of Guatemalans had either a "good" or "very good" perception of the United States, down from 80% in 2015.

Country comparison

Goals of US Policy In Guatemala 

The United States Department of State lists the policy objectives in Guatemala which include:
 Support the institutionalization of democracy and the process of peace accords;
 Promotion of human rights and the rule of law, and application of the International Commission Against Impunity in Guatemala (CICIG);
 Support an increase in economic growth and sustainable development and maintain mutually beneficial commercial and commercial relationships, including ensuring that the benefits of CAFTA-DR reach all sectors of the Guatemalan population;
 Cooperating to combat money laundering, corruption, narcotics trafficking, alien-smuggling, and other transnational crime; and
 Supporting Central American integration through support for resolution of border/territorial disputes.

On July 15, 2019, Guatemalan President Jimmy Morales cancelled a meeting with U.S. President Donald Trump after the Guatemala Supreme Court issued an injunction against a proposed deal concerning the Trump Administration's policy objective of limiting the number of Guatemalan migrants entering the United States of America. Morales had been expected to sign the deal, which also sought to use Guatemala as a place where crossing Central American migrants had to apply for asylum before entering the U.S., under pressure from the U.S. government. The agreement was canceled by the Biden administration on February 5, 2021.

The United States’ Support For Peace Agreements In Guatemala 
The United States Department of State says that the U.S, as a member of the ‘Los Amigos de Guatemala’ coalition, along with Colombia, Mexico, Spain, Norway, and Venezuela, played an important role in peace agreements moderated by the UN, provided public support. The United States strongly supports the six substantial peace agreements and three procedural agreements that, combined with the signing of the final agreement on December 29, 1996, form the blueprint for a profound political, economic, and social change. To this end, the government of the United States has committed more than $500 million to support the application of peace since 1997.

Dangers for American Citizens 
The United States Department of State observes that violent criminal activity has continued to be a major problem in Guatemala, this includes assassinations, rapes, kidnappings, and armed aggressions against people of all nationalities. In recent years the number of violent criminal activity reported by U.S citizens has increased consistently, although the number of U.S citizens visiting Guatemala has also increased. Under the administration of US President Donald Trump, the US government has also expressed about granting asylum to migrants from Guatemala and other Central American countries and has made efforts to use Guatemala to curb the number of US migrants from Central America.

United States Aid To Guatemala 
The US State Department says most U.S. assistance to Guatemala is provided through the U.S. Agency for International Development's (USAID) for Guatemala. The current USAID / Guatemala program is based on the achievements of the peace process that followed the signing of the peace accords in December 1996, as well as the achievements of its 1997-2004 peace program. The current program works to advance the United States' foreign policy goals, focusing on Guatemala's potential as the United States' most important economic and commercial partner, but also recognizes the country's lagging social indicators and its high poverty rate.

US Embassy staff 
Principal U.S. Embassy officials include:
 Ambassador--Luis E. Arreaga
 Deputy Chief of Mission—David Hodge
 Political and Economic Counselor—Drew Blakeney
 Management Officer—Leo Hession
 Defense Attache—Col. Humberto Rodriguez
 Military Assistance Group—Col. Linda Gould
 Consul General—John Lowell
 Regional Security Officer—John Eustace
 Public Affairs Officer—David J. Young
 Drug Enforcement Administration—Michael O'Brien
 Agricultural Attache—Robert Hoff
 Commercial Attache—Patricia Wagner
 USAID/G-CAP Director—Wayne Nilsestuen

See also 
 Guatemalan Americans
 United States involvement in regime change in Latin America
 Guatemalan Immigration to the United States
 Foreign relations of the United States
 Foreign relations of Guatemala
 Guatemalan Civil War
 Western Hemisphere Institute for Security Cooperation
 Syphilis experiments in Guatemala
 1954 Guatemalan coup d’état

References

Further reading
 Streeter, Stephen M. "Interpreting the 1954 US Intervention in Guatemala: Realist, Revisionist, and Postrevisionist Perspectives." History Teacher 34.1 (2000): 61–74.  online
 Taft-Morales, Maureen. "Guatemala: political, security, and Socioeconomic conditions and U.S. relations." Congressional Research Service (CRS) Reports and Issue Briefs  (2014) online

External links

 History of Guatemala - U.S. relations

 
Bilateral relations of the United States
United States